The Lords of the Three Mountains (also Kings of the Three Mountains) are a triad of Taoist deities worshiped in Southern China among the Teochew people and some Hakka people in Taiwan.

The Three Mountains refer to three mountains in Jiexi County, Jieyang City of Guangdong:
Jin Mountain - protected by the Great Lord
Ming Mountain - protected by the Second Lord
Du Mountain - protected by the Third Lord

Temples
 Three Mountains King Temple in Jiuru Township, Pingtung County, Taiwan
 Sam Shan Kwok Wong Temple in Ngau Chi Wan, New Kowloon, Hong Kong

References

Folk saints
Chinese gods
Mountain gods
Hakka Taoism
Taiwanese folk religion